HMS Venerable was a 74-gun third-rate ship of the line of the Royal Navy, launched on 19 April 1784 at Blackwall Yard.

Service history
In 1795, Veneraable is known to have been under the command of Captain James Bissett.

In 1797, Venerable served as Admiral Duncan's flagship at the Battle of Camperdown.

In 1801, Venerable took part in the First Battle of Algeciras on 6 July and the Second Battle of Algeciras on 12–13 July. During the latter engagement, she was driven ashore on the coast of Spain in Algeciras Bay, but she was refloated, repaired, and returned to service.

Fate

Venerable was wrecked on 24 November 1804, off Roundham Head near Torbay. Three of her crew were lost.

Newspapers reported a dispatch dated 28 November: The Venerable had gone to pieces in a tremendous gale, the number of men drowned is said to be 13 — they are supposed to have been intoxicated when the ship struck. The commander of the Venerable was captain Hunter a brave and skilful officer and a gentleman of considerable literary and scientific acquirements who was for some time governor of New South Wales and has favoured the public with an interesting account of that colony.

Citations and notes

References

Lavery, Brian (2003) The Ship of the Line - Volume 1: The development of the battlefleet 1650-1850. Conway Maritime Press. .
Michael Phillips. Venerable (74) (1784). Michael Phillips' Ships of the Old Navy. Retrieved 8 August 2007.

External links
 

Ships of the line of the Royal Navy
Culloden-class ships of the line
1784 ships
Ships built by the Blackwall Yard
Maritime incidents in 1801
Shipwrecks in the Mediterranean Sea
Shipwrecks of Spain
Maritime incidents in 1804
Shipwrecks of England